Dysmachus trigonus, the fan-bristled robberfly, is a species of robber fly (family Asilidae). It preys on other insects in flight.

References

External links

Diptera of Europe
Asilidae
Insects described in 1804